John Howe (born August 21, 1957) is a Canadian book illustrator and conceptual designer, best-known for his artwork of J. R. R. Tolkien's Middle-earth. One year after graduating from high school, he studied in a college in Strasbourg, France, then at the École des arts décoratifs in the same town.

Howe and  Tolkien artist Alan Lee served as chief conceptual designers for Peter Jackson's The Lord of the Rings movie trilogy. Howe illustrated the Lord of the Rings board game created by Reiner Knizia, and re-illustrated the maps of The Lord of the Rings, The Hobbit, and The Silmarillion in 1996–2003. His work includes images of mythological material such as the Old English epic poem Beowulf (including Knizia's board game Beowulf: The Legend). Howe illustrated many books in the fantasy genre, such as those by Robin Hobb. He also contributed to the film adaptation of The Lion, the Witch, and the Wardrobe by C. S. Lewis, The Chronicles of Narnia. In 2005 a limited edition of George R. R. Martin's novel A Clash of Kings was released by Meisha Merlin, with numerous illustrations by Howe.

Howe has illustrated cards for the Magic: The Gathering collectible card game.

For The Hobbit films, original director Guillermo del Toro and replacement director Peter Jackson consulted with both Howe and fellow conceptual artist Alan Lee to ensure continuity of design.

Howe is a member of the living history group the Company of Saynt George, and has expertise in ancient and medieval armour and armaments.

Howe also served as a conceptual designer for Amazon's The Lord of the Rings: The Rings of Power, which premiered on Prime Video on September 2, 2022.

Biography
John Howe was born in Vancouver, British Columbia. He was drawing from pre-school age, with his mother's help. Around primary school age he found his mother's ability no longer living up to his expectations, and even got frustrated once at both his mother and himself at not being able to draw a cow to his expectations. Howe's school years were complicated by moves which took place with a timing that left the art classes full, and left him in classes like power mechanics. He did find his ability as a draughtsman to be profitable in biology class though, where he and a friend would produce renderings of microscopic organisms for classmates at fifty cents each. As a child, he collected the covers of paperbacks. His collection included items from Frank Frazetta, Barry Smith, and Bernie Wrightson. In his adolescence, Howe read The Lord of the Rings trilogy by J. R. R. Tolkien. He said he got "a real spark" from the Hildebrandt calendars, which showed him that the books could be illustrated. Howe made drawings of his own versions of the scenes depicted in the calendar. These drawings, according to Howe, may not have survived.

A year after his high school graduation, Howe moved to Strasbourg, France to attend college. The following year, he enrolled into the École des arts décoratifs. He cites his experience of this period as follows:

Throughout his first years in Europe, Howe was taking in as much as he could in the way of art, architecture and everything that was "simultaneously ancient and novel." He says the only piece of his art work that survived from this period is his "The Lieutenant of the Black Tower of Barad-dûr", a piece inspired by Tolkien's The Lord of the Rings. He says if this is not his first published piece, it must certainly be the earliest. Howe's earliest commissions included political cartoons, magazine illustrations, comics, animated films, advertising, of which he says were nightmares. He said that he would end up redoing sketches so many times that there was nothing left of "his" in them. This frustrated him, and he wondered how he would ever make it in the profession.

Projects in which Howe worked include The Lord of the Rings, J.R.R. Tolkien's Books and Merchandise, Beowulf, Robin Hobb's books, The Lion, The Witch, and The Wardrobe, Cards for Magic: The Gathering, The Hobbit, Pan's Labyrinth. Howe has also written and illustrated children's books.

Selected works
 The Fisherman & His Wife, transl. from Brothers Grimm (Mankato, Minnesota: Creative Education, 1983).  — picture book
 The Enchanted World: Night Creatures (Time Life, 1985)
 The Enchanted World: Water Spirits (Time Life, 1985)
 The Enchanted World: Dwarfs (Time Life, 1985)
 The Enchanted World: Giants and Ogres (Time Life, 1985)
 Rip Van Winkle by Washington Irving, retold by John Howe (Little, Brown & Company, 1988) 
 Jack and the Beanstalk, retold by John Howe (Little, Brown & Company, 1989)  

 Knights: A 3-Dimensional Exploration (Tango Books, 1995) 
 The Knight With the Lion: The Story of Yvain (Little, Brown & Company, 1996) 
 A Diversity of Dragon by Anne McCaffrey with Richard Woods (Atheneum Books, 1997) 
 Images of Middle-Earth (HarperCollins, 2000) 
 The Maps of Tolkien's Middle-earth by Brian Sibley (Houghton Mifflin Harcourt, 2003) 
 The King of Winter's Daughter (Little, Brown & Company, 2005) 
 Fantasy Encyclopedia (Kingfisher, 2005)
 Wizardology: The Book of the Secrets of Merlin (Candlewick Press, 2005)
 Myth and Magic: The Art of John Howe (Barnes & Noble, 2006) 
 Fantasy Art Workshop (Impact Books, 2007) 
 Forging Dragons: Inspirations, Approaches and Techniques for Drawing and Painting Dragons (David & Charles, 2008) 
 Fantasy Drawing Workshop (Impact Books, 2009) 
 Lost Worlds (Kingfisher, 2009)

See also
 Works inspired by J. R. R. Tolkien

References

External links

 
 
 
 

 

1957 births
Artists from Vancouver
Canadian illustrators
Fantasy artists
Game artists
Living people
Tolkien artists